Tímea Babos was the defending champion, but chose to participate at the 2015 WTA Finals instead.

Monica Niculescu won the title, defeating Pauline Parmentier in the final, 7–5, 6–2.

Seeds

Draw

Finals

Top half

Bottom half

References
Main Draw

Internationaux Feminins de la Vienne - Doubles